Josiane da Silva Tito (born August 8, 1979, in Rio de Janeiro) is a Brazilian sprinter and middle-distance runner.

Career
She set a personal best time of 2:01.28 for the 800 metres at the 2007 Pan American Games, coincidentally in her home city. Tito also competed as part of the women's national sprint team for the 4 × 400 m relay at the 2004 Summer Olympics in Athens.

At the 2008 Summer Olympics in Beijing, Tito competed for the second time in women's 4 × 400 m relay, along with her teammates Lucimar Teodoro, Maria Laura Almirão, and Emmily Pinheiro. She ran on the second leg of the second heat, with an individual-split time of 52.60 seconds. Tito and her team finished the relay in sixth place for a total time of 3:30.10, failing to advance into the final.

Few days before the 2009 IAAF World Championships in Berlin, Tito was among the five Brazilian athletes who failed the competition drug test for a banned substance recombinant EPO. She served a two-year suspension by IAAF, making her ineligible to compete for other international events, including the world and national championships.

Achievements

References

External links

Profile – UOL Esporte 
NBC 2008 Olympics profile

Brazilian female sprinters
Brazilian female middle-distance runners
Living people
Olympic athletes of Brazil
Athletes (track and field) at the 2004 Summer Olympics
Athletes (track and field) at the 2008 Summer Olympics
Athletes from Rio de Janeiro (city)
1979 births
Doping cases in athletics
Brazilian sportspeople in doping cases
Pan American Games medalists in athletics (track and field)
Pan American Games bronze medalists for Brazil
Athletes (track and field) at the 2003 Pan American Games
Medalists at the 2003 Pan American Games
Olympic female sprinters
21st-century Brazilian women